New Almelo is an unincorporated community in Norton County, Kansas, United States.

History
New Elam was issued a post office in 1879. The post office was renamed New Almelo in 1901, then discontinued in 1996.

It is named after the city of Almelo, Netherlands.

Education
The community is served by Norton USD 211 public school district.

References

Further reading

External links
 Norton County maps: Current, Historic, KDOT

Former populated places in Norton County, Kansas
Former populated places in Kansas